Thomas Laidlaw may refer to:

Thomas Laidlaw (politician) (1813–1876), New South Wales politician
Thomas Kennedy Laidlaw (1864–1943), Irish racehorse owner